Cuphonotus andraeanus is a species of plant in the Brassicaceae family, and was first described in 1885 by Ferdinand von Mueller as Capsella andraeana. It was reassigned to the genus, Cuphonotus, in 1974 by Elizabeth Anne Shaw.

It is found throughout inland Australia.

Description 
It is an annual herb growing to 25 cm tall, and is spreading or erect. It has simple hairs, which may be flattened, terete or twisted. The leaves at the base are entire and up to 3 cm long, while those on the stem are similar but reduced in size.

References

Taxa named by Ferdinand von Mueller
Brassicaceae